Dreństwo  (also: Dręstwo) is a village in the administrative district of Gmina Bargłów Kościelny, within Augustów County, Podlaskie Voivodeship, in north-eastern Poland.

References

Villages in Augustów County
Łomża Governorate
Białystok Voivodeship (1919–1939)
Belastok Region